No. 538 Squadron RAF was one of the ten Turbinlite nightfighter squadrons of the Royal Air Force during the Second World War.

History
No. 538 Squadron was formed at RAF Hibaldstow, Lincolnshire on 2 September 1942, from No. 1459 (Turbinlite) Flight, as part of No. 9 Group RAF in Fighter Command. Instead of operating only Turbinlite and -rudimentary- Airborne Intercept (AI) radar equipped aircraft (Havocs and Bostons) and working together with a normal nightfighter unit, such as in their case No. 253 Squadron RAF while still 1458 Flight, the unit now also flew with their own Hawker Hurricanes. It was disbanded at Hibaldstow on 25 January 1943, when Turbinlite squadrons were, due to lack of success on their part and the rapid development of AI radar, thought to be superfluous.

Aircraft operated

Squadron bases

Commanding officers

References

Notes

Bibliography

External links
 Squadron.cfm 538 Squadron history on MOD site
 No. 538 Squadron RAF movement and equipment history
 Squadron histories for nos. 521–540 squadron on RafWeb's Air of Authority – A History of RAF Organisation

No. 538 Squadron
Military units and formations established in 1942
Military units and formations disestablished in 1943
1942 establishments in England
1943 disestablishments in England